Alexander Knight may refer to:
 Alexander Knight (cricketer)
 Alexander Knight (politician)
 Alec Knight, Dean of Lincoln